Greenhouse Academy is a tween drama television series released by Netflix. Based on the Israeli television series The Greenhouse (Ha-Hamama), created by Giora Chamizer, the series was adapted for international audiences by Chamizer and Paula Yoo. The first season of the series was released on Netflix on September 8, 2017. The second season was released on Netflix on February 14, 2018, the third season was released on October 25, 2019, and the fourth season was released on March 20, 2020. In July 2020, it was announced that Greenhouse Academy had been canceled after four seasons.

Premise 
Eight months after losing their astronaut mother in a rocket explosion, brother and sister Alex and Hayley Woods enroll at a private boarding school for gifted future leaders. Separately, they join two competing houses within the school and become rivals. Soon, mysterious events draw the students from both houses into a top secret investigation. They uncover a deadly plot to use earthquakes for monetary gain. Only by joining forces and working together will they be able to stop this scheme.

Cast

Main 

 Ariel Mortman as Hayley Woods, a new student at Greenhouse Academy and a member of The Ravens
 Finn Roberts as Alex Woods, Hayley's younger brother and a member of the Eagles
 Chris O'Neal as Daniel Hayward, Captain of The Eagles
 Dallas Hart as Leo Cruz, Captain of The Ravens
 Cinthya Carmona as Sophie Cardona, a member of The Eagles and Brooke's best friend
 Grace Van Dien (seasons 1–2) and Danika Yarosh (seasons 3-4) as Brooke Osmond, the dean's daughter and a member of The Eagles
 Benjamin Papac as Max Miller, a member of The Ravens
 Jessica Amlee (seasons 1–2) as Jackie Sanders, a juvenile delinquent recruited in The Ravens
 BJ Mitchell as Parker Grant, a member of The Eagles and Daniel's best friend
 Aviv Buchler (seasons 1–2) and Dana Melanie (seasons 3-4) as Emma Geller, member of The Ravens

 Ishai Golan as FBI Agent Carter Woods, Hayley and Alex's father, who is still investigating his wife's death
 Selina Giles as Ryan Woods, Hayley and Alex's mother, a former astronaut who is presumed dead after a tragic accident
 Yiftach Mizrahi as Jason Osmond, Brooke's older brother
 Nitsan Levartovsky as Suzanne McGill, staff member at Greenhouse Academy
 Parker Stevenson as Louis Osmond, Jason and Brooke's father, founder and head of Greenhouse Academy
 Nadine Ellis as Judy Hayward (seasons 1-2), Daniel's mother
 Yuval Yanai as Eric Simmons, FBI agent and Carter's best friend
 Reina Hardesty as Aspen Fairchild (seasons 1–2), Leo's love interest, who is also a member of The Raven
 Rafael Cebrian as Enzo (seasons 3-4), Sophie's ex-boyfriend
 Michael Aloni as The Client, Jason's split-personality character

Recurring 
 Efrat Dor as Michelle Wallace
 Natalie Berkowitz as Meredith
 Dean Gerber as Owen
 Jake Miller as Seth
 Stephanie Troyak as Tammy
 Amit Yagur as Becca
 Zvika Fohrman as Coach Davies
 Jonathan Miller as Kyle
 Maayan Bloom as Marcus
 Errol Trotman Harewood as David Diggs
 Iftach Ophir as Perry FBI Agent
 Aaron Kaplan as Brandon Thomas

Production and release 
Greenhouse Academy is a Netflix original series based on the Israeli tween-drama The Greenhouse (Ha-Hamama), which ran on Nickelodeon Israel. Both versions were created by Giora Chamizer and produced by Nutz Productions, a subsidiary of Ananey Communications. Two seasons consisting of a total of 24 episodes were produced. The series was filmed in summer 2016 in Tel Aviv and at other locations in Israel. The first season was released on Netflix on September 8, 2017. On January 18, 2018, the official Greenhouse Academy Instagram account announced that season 2 would be released on Netflix on February 14, 2018.

The series was "quietly" renewed for a third season in March 2018. In September 2018, the role of Brooke Osmond was recast with Danika Yarosh, after Grace Van Dien was cast in The Village which was picked up to series by NBC for the 2018–19 U.S. television season. Season 3 was released on Netflix on October 25, 2019. Season 4 was released on March 20, 2020.

Episodes

Season 1 (2017)

Season 2 (2018)

Season 3 (2019)

Season 4 (2020)

References

External links 
 

2017 American television series debuts
2020 American television series endings
2010s American high school television series
2010s American drama television series
2020s American high school television series
2020s American drama television series
American television series based on Israeli television series
English-language Netflix original programming
Netflix children's programming
Television shows set in Malibu, California
Television series about the Federal Bureau of Investigation